Big West Conference women's volleyball is an American collegiate volleyball conference. It includes 10-12 women's teams from various colleges and universities. Before the 2017–18 school year, the Big West sponsored volleyball only for women, but the conference added a men's volleyball league in that school year. (NCAA women's volleyball is a fall sport, while NCAA men's volleyball is a spring sport.) In 2012, Beach Volleyball began as a recognized collegiate sport. By 2016 this conference officially began play as one of the firsts in the nation.

History 
Through 2010, Big West volleyball teams had earned a combined 22 NCAA final four appearances among four teams. In 1981, pre-shuffling SDSU, two BWC stalwarts were able to make the contemporaneous representation.

The San Diego State University Aztecs became the first Big West program to reach the final four. University of the Pacific also reached the post-1981 final four. University of Hawaii (UHM) was the Big West's first national champion in 1982. In 1998 California State University, Long Beach (CSULB) dominated the NCAA in a 36-0 season (the first to do so). At the turn of the 21st century, only UH and CSULB have been able to reach the final four—a total of five thus-far seasons.

In 2012, former WAC member UHM joined Big West play for the first time since 1995. They won the regular season in 1995 and in 2012. BWC Schools' histories by annals would show competitive edges in B1G and PAC12 head-to-head duels.

Cal Poly San Luis Obispo became a perennial Beach Top 10 performer, with HC Todd Rogers.

As of 2018 the BWC is the only NCAA conference to sponsor an official pairs bracket following the awarding of a Team Championship. The 2018 winners as posted in the finals bracket were: T. Van Winden/Miric (CPSU) defeated Barber/Karelov (LBSU), 2-1.
In 2019, the winning and dominant pair of Crissy Jones/Miric (CPSLO) were recognized as The BWC pair. Emily Sonny and Macy Gordon, in 2021.

Spike & Serve–Waikiki hosts, annually on the shores of Queens Beach, the autumn international draw of Pac Rim Championships.

Teams

† Since 1984, when the Big West was known as the P.C.A.A.
 * As a member of the pre2013 Big West

Big West Award History

Coach of the Year

Player of the Year

Freshman of the Year

Setter of the Year

Defensive Player of the Year

Big West volleyball in the AVCA
The American Volleyball Coaches Association (AVCA) annually awards Coach of the Year and Player of the Year honors. The following lists coaches/players from the Big West who have received these top awards.

Coach of the Year
1982 - Dave Shoji, Hawai'i
1986 - John Dunning, University of the Pacific
1989 - Brian Gimmillaro, Long Beach State 
1993 - Kathy Gregory (Int'l VB HOF'r 1986-97 WPVA Exe. Dir.), UC Santa Barbara
1998 - Brian Gimmillaro, Long Beach State
2009 - Dave Shoji, Hawai'i

Player of the Year
1982, 1983 - Deitre Collins, Hawai'i
1986 - Elaina Oden, University of the Pacific
1987 - Tonya Williams, Hawai'i
1988 - Tara Cross, Long Beach State 
1989 - Tonya Williams & Tara Cross, Hawai'i & Long Beach State
1991 - Antoniette White, Long Beach State
1993 - Danielle Scott, Long Beach State
1996 - Angelica Ljungqvist, Hawai'i
1997, 1998 - Misty May, Long Beach State
2003 - Kim Willoughby, Hawai'i

Big West Beach Volleyball (AVCA/NCAA)

2012-2016 as an Emerging Sport
CSULB reached the post-season as National Runners-up in 2012; as National Champions in 2013; as National Runners-up in 2015. UHM reached the post-season in 2014 and 2015. All-American choices were: Caitlyn Ledoux/Tara Roennicke (2012, 2013); Jane Croson (2012), Karissa Cook (2014), Katie Spieler (2014), Brittany Tiegs (2014, 2015), Nikki Taylor (2014, 2015)

NCAA Collegiate Beach Volleyball Championships

 UHM won all the way to the Gulf Shores, AL NCAA Championships with All-Americans Emily Maglio/Katie Spieler (2016); Morgan Martin/Mikayla Tucker (2017); Emily Maglio/Ka'iwi Schucht (2018) and HM AVCA all-American Amy Ozee (2019). Hawai'i does it seven-in-a-row for 2020.
 Long Beach State won with All-Americans Rachel Nieto/Nele Barber (2017); with non-Championships (CSULB 2018), HM AVCA all-American Nele Barber. Hailey Harward (AVP, 2017–19) has consecutively made the-money-rounds on tour. Cali Bunn has retired from BVB.
 All-American Torrey Van Winden, a 2016 World Championships semifinalist, she represented the CPSLO Mustangs in 2018 (w freshman, Canadian, AA, Tiadora Miric). Sister Adlee (Van Winden), along with Taylor Nelson, earned All-American status during 2017-18. Crissy Jones (1st Team AVCA AA) was in as representation for 2019. Poly returned for a second consecutive NCAAT appearance in 2020.

References

External links
Big West Volleyball

 
Women's volleyball leagues